The Rover was a steam-powered yacht built in 1930 by Alexander Stephen and Sons in Glasgow, Scotland for Lord Inchcape, then chairman of the Peninsular and Oriental Steam Navigation Company (P&O).

Description 
The yacht's figurehead was a likeness of Lord Inchcape's daughter, Elsie Mackay, who disappeared whilst attempting to fly the Atlantic in 1928. With accommodation for up to 14 guests, the yacht was painted green and white at launch with a predominantly silver-coloured dining room.

The Rover'''s staterooms featured en-suite marbled bathrooms. Dancing and games were staged on the open decks. Long-distance fuel tanks permitted long round-the-world voyages. During Cowes Week in August 1930, she was visited by the then King George V and Queen Mary.

 Later career 
After Lord Inchcape's death aboard the Rover in Monte Carlo's harbour, Port Hercules in Monaco, on 23May 1932, rumours circulated that the Aga Khan would buy the yacht, while a rumoured deal with King Carol II of Romania also fell through. However, a year later she was bought by American businessman Howard Hughes unseen and renamed Southern Cross.

The vessel subsequently served in the Mexican Navy as Orizaba'' until she was scrapped around 1960.

References

External links

Photographs
 Starboard broadside view
 "Owner's Room"

Individual yachts
1930 ships
Steam yachts
Ships built on the River Clyde
Ships of the United Kingdom
Ships of the United States
Howard Hughes
Ships of Sweden
Battle of the Atlantic
Ships of the Mexican Navy